Jan Roegiers (1944–2013) was a professor at the Katholieke Universiteit Leuven, and also university archivist, librarian and curator. He specialised in early modern academic history, and in particular the history of the pre-1797 University of Leuven. During his lifetime he was "generally regarded as one of the most authoritative voices in the world of academic history, archive and library science and the heritage sector in Belgium." He is also credited with giving the newly established Flemish university (an independent institution only from 1968) a sense of historical continuity with Leuven's past.

Early life
Jan Roegiers was born in Sleidinge, East Flanders, on 19 October 1944. He attended the Sint-Vincentiuscollege in Eeklo and from there entered the diocesan seminary in Ghent. After a short time in the seminary he enrolled at the Katholieke Universiteit Leuven, where he completed degrees in History and in library and archive science.

Academic career
He became a senior lecturer in the faculty of Arts and the faculty of Theology, chief archivist of the university (1975–2009), head of Leuven University Library (1981–1996), and curator of the university's art collection (1983–2009).

He was director of the Revue d'histoire ecclésiastique (1990-2009), chair of the editorial board of LIAS: Journal of Early Modern Intellectual Culture and its Sources (1993-2009), and chair of the editorial board of Trajecta (1998-2009). He was a moving influence on the early stages of the Flemish short-title catalogue (STCV).

Roegiers gave his valedictory lecture, on academic heritage and university history, on 19 February 2010. On the same occasion he was presented with a Festschrift celebrating his career, The Quintessence of Lives: Intellectual Biographies in the Low Countries presented to Jan Roegiers, edited by P. Delsaerdt, H. Schwall, D. Vanysacker, and J.-P. Delville (Brepols, 2010). His retirement was marked with a special exhibition in Leuven University's Central Library, Anima Academiae Bibliotheca, from 10 June to 25 August 2010.

Roegiers died on 12 July 2013 and was buried on 19 July in the Sint-Jan-de-Doperkerk in Leuven. The reading room of the university archive was named "Jan Roegiers reading room" in his memory. His rich library went to KU Leuven Libraries after his death.

Publications

References

1944 births
2013 deaths
Academic librarians
Belgian archivists
20th-century Belgian historians
KU Leuven alumni
Academic staff of KU Leuven
People from Evergem
21st-century Belgian historians